This is a list of members of the Alberta, Canada, branch of the Co-operative Commonwealth Federation (CCF), a social democratic political party, and its successor, the Alberta New Democratic Party (NDP) who have been elected at either the provincial or federal level.

Provincial Politics

1942 by-election 
A CCFer was elected to the Legislative Assembly of Alberta for the first time in a 1942 by-election. (Camrose college instructor and CCF leader Chester Ronning had been elected in October 25, 1932 provincial by-election as joint UFA/CCF candidate but was defeated in 1935 and was unable to regain his seat in the 1940 election. He resigned as CCF leader in 1942 and went on to be Canada's ambassador to China, where he had been born. Angus James Morrison was elected as a Labour MLA in 1940 by defeating the incumbent Social Credit MLA as well as a CCF candidate. The CCF and the Alberta Labour clubs merged in 1942 but Morrison did not run for re-election in 1944.)
Elmer Roper - printer, labour activist, Mayor of Edmonton 1959-1963 - Edmonton #1 1942by-1944-1948-1952-1955 (Ran, CCF Lost)

1944 general election 
A second CCF was elected in a by-election. By joining Elmer Roper, he increased the party's caucus in the Legislature to two members.
Aylmer Liesemer - teacher - Calgary #5 1944-1948-1952

1948 general election 
Both incumbent CCFers were re-elected in the 1948 election, but the party won no additional seats.

1952 general election 
A new CCF MLA was elected in the 1952 election, and Roper was re-elected.
Nick Dushenski - Willingdon - 1952-1955-1959 (1959 did not run, a different CCF candidate was unsuccessful)

1955 general election 
A new CCF MLA was elected in the 1955 election, while Roper lost his seat.
Stanley Ruzycki - Vegreville - 1955-1959

1959 and 1963 general elections 
No CCFers or New Democrats were elected in the 1959 or 1963 general elections including leader Neil Reimer.

1966 by-election 
One New Democrat was elected in a 1966 by-election.
Garth Turcott - Pincher Creek-Crowsnest 1966by-1967 (ran, NDP lost)

1967 general election 
No New Democrats were elected in the 1967 election.

1971 general election 
One New Democrat was elected in the 1971 election.
Grant Notley - teacher - Spirit River-Fairview (Dunvegan-Central Peace) 1971-1975-1979-1982-1984 (died in plane crash)

1975-1979 general elections 
The single New Democrat was re-elected alone in these elections.

1982 general election 
One additional New Democrat was elected in the 1982 election, increasing the party's caucus to two members.
Ray Martin - Edmonton Norwood - 1982-1986-1993, Edmonton-Beverly-Cleaview 2004-2008

1985 by-election 
The NDP retained one seat in a 1985 by-election, caused by the death of Grant Notley.
Jim Gurnett - Spirit River-Fairview - 1985by-1986 (1986 ran but was not re-elected)

1986 general election 
Fifteen additional New Democrats were elected in the 1986 election, increasing the party's caucus to 16 members.
Leo Piquette - Athabasca-Lac La Biche - 1986-1989  (1989 ran but was not re-elected)
Barry Pashak - Calgary Forest Lawn - 1986-1989-1993 (1993 ran, but not re-elected)
Bob Hawkesworth - Calgary Mountain View - 1986-1989-1993 (1993 ran, but not re-elected)
Marie Laing - Edmonton Avonmore - 1986-1989-1993 (1993 ran, but not re-elected)
Tom Sigurdson - Edmonton Belmont - 1986-1989-1993 (1993 ran, but not re-elected)
Ed Ewasiuk - Edmonton Beverly - 1986-1989-1993 (1993 ran, but not re-elected) (formerly Edmonton Alderman 1980-1986)
Christie Mjolsness - Edmonton Calder - 1986-1989-1993 (1993 ran, but not re-elected)
William Roberts - Edmonton Centre - 1986-1989-1993 (1993 ran, but not re-elected)
John Younie - Edmonton Glengarry - 1986-1989 (ran, but not re-elected)
Pam Barrett - Edmonton Highlands - 1986-1989-1993, 1997-2000by (2000 retired, a different NDP candidate won)
Alex McEachern - Edmonton Kingsway - 1986-1989-1993 (1993 ran, but not re-elected)
Gerry Gibeault - Edmonton Mill Woods - 1986-1989-1993 (1993 ran, but not re-elected)
Gordon Wright - Edmonton Strathcona - 1986-1989-1990by  (died in office, NDP-er Barrie Chivers won the subsequent by-election)
Bryan Strong - St. Albert  - 1986-1989 (1989 did not run)
Derek Fox - Vegreville - 1986-1989-1993 (1993 ran, but not re-elected)

1989 general election 
The party lost three MLAs (Piquette, Younie, Strong) but gained three other seats in the 1989 election.
John McInnis - Edmonton Jasper Place - 1989-1993 (1993 ran, but not re-elected)
Stan Woloshyn - Stony Plain - 1989-1993 (he joined the P-C caucus)
Jerry Doyle - West Yellowhead - 1989-1993 (1993 ran, but not re-elected)

1990 by-election 
An additional New Democrat was elected in a 1990 by-election, occasioned by the death of sitting MLA Gordon Wright.

Barrie Chivers  - Edmonton Strathcona 1990-1993 (1993 ran, but not re-elected)

1993 general election 
All incumbent New Democrats were defeated and no new NDP MLAs were elected in the 1993 election.

1997 general election 
Two New Democrats were elected in the 83 seats available in the 1997 election, one of whom (Pam Barrett) had previously served in the Legislature.
Raj Pannu  - Edmonton Strathcona 1997-2008 (retired, but a different NDP candidate, Rachel Notley (daughter of former NDP MLA Grant Notley), won)

2000 by-election 
The NDP retained one seat in a 2000 by-election, occasioned by the resignation of Pam Barrett.
Brian Mason  - Edmonton Highlands 2000-2004, Edmonton Highlands-Norwood 2004–2019 (formerly Edmonton Councillor Oct. 1989-2000)

2001 general election 
The party won two of the 83 seats available in the 2001 election - Pannu and Mason being re-elected.

2004 general election 
The party won two additional seats in the 2004 election, for a total of four (including sitting MLAs Raj Pannu and Brian Mason). One of the new members, Ray Martin (Edmonton Beverly Clareview), had previously served in the Legislature.
David Eggen  - Edmonton-Calder 2004-2008 (2008 ran, not re-elected); 2012–2019, Edmonton-North West 2019–present

2008 general election 
The NDP lost 2 of its MLAs (Ray Martin and Dave Eggen) but re-elected Mason and Rachel Notley was elected to hold the Edmonton Strathcona constituency for the party, replacing Raj Pannu.

Rachel Notley - Edmonton-Strathcona 2008–present

2012 general election 
Four NDP MLAs were elected in the 2012 Alberta election, a gain of 2. Dave Eggen, Brian Mason and Rachel Notley were re-elected and a new NDP MLA was elected:

Deron Bilous - Edmonton-Beverly-Clareview 2012–present

2015 general election 
In a surprise result, the NDP won 50 seats and formed a majority government with leader Rachel Notley elected premier-designate. Former leader Brian Mason, as well as David Eggen and Deron Bilous were re-elected.

 Shaye Anderson - Leduc-Beaumont, 2015-2019
 Erin Babcock - Stony Plain, 2015-2019
 Oneil Carlier - Whitecourt-Ste. Anne, 2015-2019
 Jon Carson - Edmonton-Meadowlark 2015-2019, Edmonton-West Henday 2019–present (previously held riding of Edmonton-Meadowlark eliminated in re-distribution)
 Joe Ceci - Calgary-Fort, 2015-2019 Calgary-Buffalo, 2019-present (previously held riding of Calgary-Fort eliminated in re-distribution)
 Michael Connolly - Calgary-Hawkwood, 2015-2019
 Craig Coolahan - Calgary-Klein, 2015-2019
 Estefania Cortes-Vargas - Strathcona-Sherwood Park, 2015-2019
 Lorne Dach - Edmonton-McClung, 2015–present 
 Thomas Dang - Edmonton-South West 2015–present, Edmonton-South 2019–present (previously held riding of Edmonton-South West eliminated in re-distribution)
 Deborah Drever - Calgary-Bow, 2015-2019 (Expelled from the NDP caucus in 2015 for inappropriate social media posts, but was re-admitted in 2016)
 Richard Feehan - Edmonton-Rutherford, 2015–present 
 Maria Fitzpatrick - Lethbridge-East, 2015-2019
 Kathleen Ganley - Calgary-Buffalo 2015-2019, Calgary-Mountain View 2019–present (switched from previous held riding to allow Joe Ceci to contest Calgary-Buffalo)
 Nicole Goehring - Edmonton-Castle Downs, 2015–present
 Christina Gray - Edmonton-Mill Woods, 2015–present
 Bruce Hinkley - Wetaskiwin-Camrose, 2015-2019
 Sarah Hoffman - Edmonton-Glenora, 2015–present 
 Trevor Horne - Spruce Grove-St. Albert, 2015-2019 
 Debbie Jabbour - Peace River, 2015-2019
 Anam Kazim - Calgary-Glenmore, 2015-2019
 Jamie Kleinsteuber - Calgary-Northern Hills, 2015-2019 
 Danielle Larivee - Lesser Slave Lake, 2015-2019
 Jessica Littlewood - Fort Saskatchewan-Vegreville, 2015-2019
 Rod Loyola - Edmonton-Ellerslie, 2015–present 
 Robyn Luff - Calgary-East, 2015-2018 (sat as an independent until the 2019 election)
 Brian Malkinson - Calgary-Currie, 2015-2019
 Marg McCuaig-Boyd - Dunvegan-Central Peace-Notley, 2015-2019 
 Annie McKitrick - Sherwood Park, 2015-2019
 Stephanie McLean - Calgary-Varsity, 2015-2019
 Karen McPherson - Calgary-MacKay-Nose Hill, 2015-2017 (left the NDP caucus and later joined the Alberta Party)
 Barb Miller - Red Deer-South, 2015-2019
 Ricardo Miranda - Calgary-Cross, 2015-2019
 Chris Nielsen - Edmonton-Decore, 2015–present 
 Brandy Payne - Calgary-Acadia, 2015-2019
 Shannon Phillips - Lethbridge-West, 2015–present 
 Colin Piquette - Athabasca-Sturgeon-Redwater, 2015-2019
 Marie Renaud - St. Albert, 2015–present 
 Eric Rosendahl - West Yellowhead, 2015-2019
 Irfan Sabir - Calgary-McCall, 2015–present 
 Marlin Schmidt - Edmonton-Gold Bar, 2015–present 
 Kim Schreiner - Red Deer North, 2015-2019
 David Shepherd - Edmonton-Centre 2015-2019, Edmonton-City Centre 2019–present (previously held riding of Edmonton-Centre eliminated in re-distribution)
 Lori Sigurdson - Edmonton-Riverview, 2015–present 
 Graham Sucha - Calgary-Shaw, 2015-2019
 Heather Sweet - Edmonton-Manning, 2015–present 
 Bob Turner - Edmonton-Whitemud, 2015-2019
 Bob Wanner - Medicine Hat, 2015-2019
 Cam Westhead - Banff-Cochrane, 2015-2019 
 Denise Woollard - Edmonton-Mill Creek, 2015-2019

2019 general election 
The NDP majority government led by Premier Rachel Notley was defeated after a single term. The party lost 30 seats but elected three new members in previously held seats.

Janis Irwin - Edmonton-Highlands-Norwood, 2019–present 

Jasvir Deol - Edmonton-Meadows, 2019–present
Rakhi Pancholi - Edmonton-Whitemud, 2019–present

Federal politics

1988 federal election 
Former political staffer Ross Harvey was the first NDP or CCF member elected to the House of Commons representing a constituency in Alberta.

Ross Harvey - Edmonton East, 1988-1993 (defeated at the 1993 election)

2008 federal election 
Environmental lawyer Linda Duncan was the second elected NDP MP for a constituency in Alberta.

Linda Duncan - Edmonton-Strathcona 2008–2019 (retired from politics at the 2019 election)

2011 federal election 
Incumbent MP Linda Duncan was re-elected.

2015 federal election 
Linda Duncan re-elected for the third and final time. She would announce her intention to retire from politics in 2018 and not stand for re-election the following year.

2019 federal election 
Local not-for-profit executive Heather McPherson was elected in Edmonton-Strathcona, succeeding Linda Duncan as the NDP representative for the riding. She was the only non-conservative elected in Alberta and Saskatchewan at the 2019 election.

Heather McPherson - Edmonton-Strathcona 2019–present

2021 federal election 
The NDP won a second seat in Alberta for the first time ever by electing members from both Edmonton Strathcona and Edmonton Griesbach.

Heather McPherson - Edmonton Strathcona 2019–present
Blake Desjarlais - Edmonton Griesbach 2021–Present

Prominent NDPers/CCFers at the municipal level 
Charles Gibbs (Alberta politician), who went by name Lionel - Labour Party MLA (1926 to his death in 1934), active in the CCF after its founding in 1932 and Edmonton city councillor (1924 to his death in 1934)
 Rice Sheppard - frequent candidate at provincial level, co-founder and executive member of The United Farmers of Alberta, long-time Edmonton city councillor, attended the CCF Founding in 1932, switched to Social Credit party in middle 1930s. He was a member of the 1933-34 Edmonton city councils when members of the Canadian Labour Party, not yet amalgamated in the CCF, held majority power.
Harry Ainlay - Edmonton mayor 1945-1949, Alberta CCF president in the 1940s, CCF provincial candidate 1936. He was a member of the 1932-1933 and 1933-34 Edmonton city councils when members of the Canadian Labour Party, not yet amalgamated in the CCF, held majority power.
 Elmer Roper - Edmonton mayor 1960-1963,CCF MLA 1942-1955
Ivor Dent - Edmonton mayor 1968-1974, city councillor 1963-1968, Alberta NDP president
Tooker Gomberg - Edmonton city councillor 1992-1995, environmental activist
William D. McLean - Edmonton city councillor 1971-1974
Jan Reimer - Edmonton mayor 1989-1995, city councillor 1980-1989
G. Lyall Roper - Edmonton city councillor 1983-1986
Bob Hawkesworth - Calgary alderman, Ward 4  then NDP MLA
Ed Ewasiuk Edmonton city councillor then NDP MLA
Brian Mason Edmonton city councillor then NDP MLA (2000-2019), party leader (2004-2014), and Minister of Transportation (2015-2019)
Joe Ceci Calgary alderman then NDP MLA and Minister of Finance (2015-2019)

See also 
List of CCF/NDP members
List of British Columbia CCF/NDP members 
List of Saskatchewan CCF/NDP members
List of Manitoba CCF/NDP members
List of Ontario CCF/NDP members
List of Nova Scotia CCF/NDP members
List of Yukon NDP members

CCF NDP members

Lists of Canadian politicians